XHCS-FM is a radio station on 103.7 FM in Veracruz, Veracruz, Mexico.

History

XHCS received its concession on September 29, 1983. It was owned by Carmen Luz Salas Peyro until the 1990s, when it was sold to Radio Mil del Puerto, an ACIR company.

In November 2021, Grupo ACIR reached a deal to sell XHCS and XHIL-FM 88.5 to Radio SA. November 23 was the last day for the ACIR Amor and Mix formats on these stations. XHCS retained the romantic music format under the name of "Música con Amor" (Music with Love). From Monday, April 11, 2022, the station standardizes its image with the rest of the romantic stations of the group Radio S.A. as Love FM.

References

Radio stations in Veracruz
Radio stations established in 1983